Central de Trabajadores Democráticos (CTD) is a trade union centre in El Salvador. It was founded in the 1980s, and is affiliated with the International Trade Union Confederation.

References

Trade unions in El Salvador
International Trade Union Confederation
Trade unions established in the 1980s